Hırka can refer to:

 Hırka, Merzifon
 Hırka, Tavas
 Hırka-i Şerif Mosque